Zamora Municipality may refer to the following places:

Zamora Municipality, Aragua, Venezuela
Zamora Municipality, Falcón, Venezuela
Zamora Municipality, Miranda, Venezuela
Zamora Municipality, Michoacán, Mexico

Municipality name disambiguation pages